"Gnat" is a song by American rapper Eminem from the deluxe edition of his eleventh studio album Music to Be Murdered By. It was released on December 18, 2020 along with the rest of Music to Be Murdered By: Side B (Deluxe Edition) and Cole Bennett-directed music video. It was written by Eminem and producer D.A. Got That Dope, alongside Anders Olofsson, Christopher S Torpey, Ezemdi Chikwendu, D. Levin, and K. Mars.

The song debuted at number 65 on the UK Singles Chart and number 11 on the UK R&B Singles Chart.

Music video
The music video for "Gnat" marks the second collaboration between Eminem and Lyrical Lemonade, as Cole Bennett previously directed music video for "Godzilla".

In the music video, Eminem fights off a swarm of oversized bats in a yellow hazmat suit and other personal protective equipment gear, wipes down every surface with Lysol, gets paranoid about catching the COVID to earn his freedom from quarantine, gets shot in the chest by a cuckolded husband after he dissed his wife, and bites the head off a bat. In some parts of the music video, Eminem is seen wearing a red tuxedo, a homage to the music video of "My Name Is".

Machine Gun Kelly line
In the chorus of the song, the lines "They come at me with machine guns, it's like trying to fight off a gnat" sparked an online debate about whether the "machine gun" mention was intended as a subliminal shot towards American rapper Machine Gun Kelly, who tweeted: "I'm under your skin" with an upside down smiley face emoji.

Personnel
Marshall Mathers – main artist, vocals, songwriter
David Doman – producer, songwriter
Luis Resto – keyboards
Mike Strange – recording, mixing
Tony Campana – recording

Charts

References

2020 songs
Eminem songs
Songs written by Eminem
Songs written by D.A. Got That Dope
Music videos directed by Cole Bennett